George William Hunter (born November 5, 1942) is an American former executive director of the National Basketball Players Association (NBPA), the players' union of the National Basketball Association (NBA). He is also a former professional football player who was a wide receiver in the National Football League (NFL) for the Washington Redskins and Miami Dolphins.

Hunter played baseball as a child, and helped lead his team to the Little League World Series in 1955. He graduated from Delaware Township High School in Delaware Township (now Cherry Hill), New Jersey, and played college football for the Syracuse Orange.  While a student-athlete at Syracuse University, "he helped organize the school's boycott of Southern schools whose stadiums were segregated."

In the NFL, he had one career reception which went for a touchdown. He caught a 29-yard touchdown pass from Dick Shiner in the fourth quarter of a game on October 10, 1965 at District of Columbia Stadium.

Following his football career, Hunter attended law school at UC Berkeley School of Law and became an attorney.  One of the youngest United States Attorneys in history, he was appointed to serve the Northern District of California, where he prosecuted high-profile federal defendants including members of Hells Angels and the Black Panther Party. Hunter was named the executive director of the NBPA in 1996.

Hunter was criticized for employing many family members within the NBPA.  An external audit initiated by Derek Fisher uncovered numerous irregularities, and a select committee of NBA players unanimously ousted Hunter from his position on February 16, 2013, during the NBA All-Star break. In May 2013, Hunter sued the NBPA, Fisher and Jamie Wior—Fisher's publicist and business partner—seeking compensation and punitive damages. The suit claimed that Fisher had a secret deal with NBA owners during the 2011 NBA lockout. In January 2014, a judge dismissed all of Hunter's claims against Wior and Fisher, and Hunter dropped his subsequent appeal in May. However, the judge also ruled that it was the union's prerogative to fire Hunter, but allowed Hunter's claim that he was still owed $10.5 million to continue.

References

1942 births
Living people
African-American sports executives and administrators
American sports executives and administrators
American football wide receivers
Syracuse Orange football players
Miami Dolphins players
Washington Redskins players
Sports labor leaders
Sportspeople from Camden, New Jersey
Cherry Hill High School West alumni
People from Cherry Hill, New Jersey
Players of American football from Camden, New Jersey
African-American players of American football
UC Berkeley School of Law alumni
21st-century African-American people
20th-century African-American sportspeople
United States Attorneys for the Northern District of California
African-American trade unionists